Carlo Festuccia (born 20 June 1980) is an Italian rugby union footballer. He started playing for L'Aquila Rugby, then moved to Gran Rugby. With both teams he competed in the Super 10 in Italy. His usual position is at hooker.

Festuccia was born in L'Aquila. he has also played for the Italian national team. He made his debut for the national team in a 2003 match against Wales, and was that same year, included in Italy's squad for the 2003 Rugby World Cup in Australia.

In 2007, he moved to France, signing with Top 14 side Racing Métro 92 and playing there for four seasons. Festuccia returned to Italy in 2011 to join the Pro12 side Aironi.

On 2 September 2013 it was announced that Festuccia would leave Zebre to join London Wasps in the Aviva Premiership.

Festuccia returned to Zebre 3 years later ahead of the 2016/17 season. On 23 January 2017, Festuccia resign with Wasps for the rest of 2016–17 season.

External links
RBS 6 Nations profile
Carlo Festuccia on ercrugby.com
RWC 2003 profile

References

1980 births
Living people
People from L'Aquila
Italian rugby union players
Rugby union hookers
Italy international rugby union players
Racing 92 players
Aironi players
Zebre Parma players
Wasps RFC players
Sportspeople from the Province of L'Aquila